Gilles-François de Beauvais (7 July 1693 – c. 1773) was a French Jesuit writer and preacher.

Born at Le Mans, France, de Beauvais entered the Society of Jesus in 1709, and taught belles-lettres, rhetoric, and philosophy. After ordination he was assigned to preach and give the Advent course at Court in 1744, during which year he published his Life of Ignatius Azevedo modelled on the original Italian biography by Father Cabral (a pseudonym of Giulio Cesare Cordara, 1743). De Beauvais dedicated his version to King Stanislans of Poland. The work is devoted to the life of the martyr Ignatius de Azevedo from Porto (1528-1570), who worked in Brazil as Visitor for the Jesuit Order. On 15 July 1570, he was killed near the Canary Islands together with his 39 companions at sea by French Calvinist pirates. In 1854, these "40 martyrs of Brazil" were canonized.

He also wrote a number of other works of devotion and for spiritual reading.
 
In 1759, he was confessor of Mme Louise de France. De Beauvais probably died in Paris in 1773.

Notes

1693 births
1770s deaths
18th-century French Jesuits
People from Le Mans